I Will Be Me is a solo album by Dave Davies, former member of The Kinks. It was released in June 2013.

Track listing
"Little Green Amp"
"Livin' in the Past"
"The Healing Boy"
"Midnight in L.A."
"In the Mainframe"
"Energy Fields"
"When I First Saw You"
"The Actress"
"Erotic Neurotic"
"You Can Break My Heart"
"Walker Through the Worlds"
"Remember the Future"
"Cote du Rhone (I Will Be Me)"

Personnel
Scott Barnes – bass
Matt Bennett – drums
Oli Brown – guitar
Azaria Byrne – vocals
Jak Coleman – guitar
Tom Currier – bass, piano
Dave Davies – guitar, keyboards, vocals, background vocals
Dennis Davison – maracas, organ
Wesley Doyle – guitar
Jürgen Engler – bass, guitar
James Freemantle – bass
Teddy Freese – drums
Geri X – vocals
Karen Grotberg – harpsichord, piano, vocals
Chris Head – guitar
Joey Horgen – guitar
Simon Jackson – guitar
Kara Jayne – bass
Steve Kille – drums
Jon Lamont – drums
Mark Laughlin – drums
Jonathan Lea – guitar, electric sitar
Chris Lietz – drums
Gary Louris – guitar, vocals
Jordan McDonald – drums
Sarah McLeod – guitar
Tim O'Reagan – drums, percussion, vocals
Mark Olson – vocals
Marc Perlman – bass
Wayne Proctor – drums
Justin Sane – guitar, vocals
Ty Segall – guitar, background vocals
Jason Simon – guitar
Chris Spedding – guitar
Pat Thetic – drums
Jon Tufnell – vocals
Bruce Tyner – pedal steel guitar
John Wesley – guitar
Yura Zeleznik – violin

References

2013 albums
Dave Davies albums